Web Application Open Platform Interface better known as WOPI is a protocol that enables a client to access and change files stored on a server. The protocol was first released as v0.1 by Microsoft in January 2012, but as of November 2020 the current specification is v12.2. The protocol has been adopted by applications outside of Microsoft, such as by Google, ownCloud and Nextcloud.

References 

Application layer protocols
Computer-related introductions in 2012